The Snorkel is a 1958 British thriller film from Hammer Films. It was directed by Guy Green and stars Peter van Eyck, Betta St. John and Mandy Miller. It was the last film role for Miller.

Plot 
Paul Decker kills his wife, Madge, by drugging her and then gassing her in a room in their Italian villa, sealing all the windows and doors but concealing himself under floorboards in the room, covered by a rug and using a snorkel attached to air pipes to breathe while hidden. Household servants discover her body in the morning and as the room has been locked and sealed from the inside, it appears to the local Italian police Inspector and British Consulate Mr. Wilson to be a case of suicide, although no suicide note has been found.

Madge's teenage daughter Candy arrives from England with her dog Toto and travelling companion Jean Edwards, and immediately accuses her stepfather, Decker, of killing her mother, based on the fact that she believes - correctly - that he also killed her father years before and made it look like an accident.  Toto senses Decker's presence under the floorboards but is not taken any notice of.  It is suggested that Candy and Jean go to America where Decker will join them later, but Candy is determined to investigate further; she goes to Decker's room to look for evidence, but it is Toto that finds the snorkel but again Candy does not recognise its importance and puts it back in a wardrobe.  When Decker finds Candy in the room she leaves shortly afterwards, but Toto again finds the snorkel and Decker realises that the dog is proving a problem and poisons him; Candy again senses the truth and accuses Decker of killing her dog, which he denies.

Decker, Jean and Candy go on a beach picnic, and Candy, seeing a man swimming with a snorkel, starts to realise how her mother's murder was carried out; when she then swims out too far, Decker swims out to her, pretending to save her but in reality hoping to drown her and make it look like an accident, but before he can do so Jean also swims out and he gives up on the idea, although again Candy knows what he was trying to do.

Decker decides that he will have to kill Candy, and, establishing an alibi as before, lures her to the villa by telling her that he has found his wife's suicide note and has asked the police Inspector to come over as well.  He 'reads' Madge's suicide note to Candy and encourages her to drink a drugged glass of milk; by the time she realises that he has made up the story she is too drowsy and Decker continues to carry out his plan, hiding under the floorboards and the rug as before.  This time however Wilson and Jean arrive in time and rescue Candy, although they refuse to believe her story that Decker was trying to kill her, believing her to be unbalanced following her mother's death.  She insists that they search the room thoroughly, including moving a heavy cabinet out from the wall, but finally agrees to leave with them.  As they leave Decker attempts to come out from his place of concealment, but the cabinet is now over the rug and he can't get out.  Candy decides to go back one more time to the room, where she hears Decker calling out for help, and realises what has happened.  She leaves him there and at first goes off with Wilson and Jean, leaving Decker to suffocate slowly, but changes her mind and tells the police Inspector to go up to the room in order to solve the case.

Cast
 Peter van Eyck - Paul Decker 
 Betta St. John - Jean Edwards 
 Mandy Miller - Candy Brown 
 Grégoire Aslan - Inspector
 William Franklyn - Wilson 
 Marie Burke - Daily Woman 
 Irene Prador - French Woman 
 Henri Vidon - Italian Gardener 
 Armand Guinle - Waiter 
 Robert Rietti - Station Sergeant 
 David Ritch - Hotel Clerk
 John Holmes' dog Flush - Toto

Production 

In the book Hammer Films: An Exhaustive Filmography, director Green recalled working on The Snorkel with producer Michael Carreras, whom he called "...very cooperative, as well as a delightful person to be with, and very much responsible for making the film a most pleasant experience. He and I had a great time casting the smaller roles." The film was the first starring vehicle for actress Mandy Miller; Green described her as "...a natural talent and a very professional girl, but a bit too mature for the part, and all our efforts failed to disguise this." Of star Peter van Eyck, Green said that "he had to do a lot of difficult swimming and, one day after spending most of the morning manfully keeping up with a motorboat from which he was being photographed, Peter said, 'You never asked me if I could swim before giving me the part.' It was true. I didn't."

The budget on The Snorkel was about 20 percent above the average Hammer Films shoot, due to the extensive location photography (the Italian villa used in the movie was Villa della Pergola, located in Alassio, Liguria's riviera).

The film was reportedly produced without a distribution deal in place. Hammer Films: An Exhaustive Filmography claims that an agreement with Warner Bros. had fallen through and Hammer executive James Carreras (father of producer Michael) only later struck a deal with Columbia Pictures for both The Snorkel and its co-feature in a double-bill, The Camp on Blood Island.

The film's story, credited to '"Anthony Dawson", has sometimes been attributed to Italian Horror director Antonio Margheriti, who often used the anglicised pseudonym "Anthony Dawson." In 2010, however, Margheriti's son denied his father was involved with the production, stating that he did not begin using the name "Anthony Dawson" until 1960. It seems likely that the true author of The Snorkel'''s story was actor Anthony Dawson, who also appeared in Hammer's Curse of the Werewolf.

The film had its premier aboard the luxury liner Queen Elizabeth, during a crossing of the Atlantic in May 1958.

 Reception 

In The New York Times, critic Richard W. Nason offered lukewarm praise for the film, writing that, "Hammer Films apparently has become proficient in the manufacture of motion pictures that are not greatly distinguished but that nonetheless manage to be more absorbing than the usual low-budget program film.... because of the competence of the direction, acting and particularly the editing, the audience is kept awake throughout the running of the twin bill. This is no mean achievement, when you consider the number of ho-hum melodramas that flow from the world's film factories every year... Anyone who wonders how a simple skin-diving snorkel can be used this way will have to see the film... And, once you think about it, it's a very silly way to do away with somebody. Both [this film and its double-bill, The Camp on Blood Island,] are for those who are looking to kill time."

Glenn Erickson of DVDTalk also offered mix praise, calling van Eyck's character "underdeveloped but menacing," and noting that, "Mandy Miller's likeable teen heroine is a doubtful mix of immature emotions and steely resolve, as shown in one poorly handled scene when Candy underreacts to the death of her beloved dog." However, he goes on to write, "The film's good reputation comes from fans that admire the killer's technically elaborate murder scheme, and ace Hammer cameraman Jack Asher's arresting camerawork. A final surprise lifted from The Third Man could have provided a perfect shock finish, but the movie goes on a bit longer, clearly to tie up some moral loose ends for the censors."

John M. Miller, writing for Turner Classic Movies, was more positive: "The Snorkel'' opens with one of the more memorable pre-credits sequences to be found in a thriller...While not a classic, this clever and twisted thriller, as well as Peter van Eyck's chilling performance, is overdue for greater exposure."

References

External links
 

1958 films
British thriller films
1950s thriller films
1950s English-language films
Films directed by Guy Green
Columbia Pictures films
Hammer Film Productions films
Films with screenplays by Jimmy Sangster
1950s British films